Sar Zamin Khan (born 3 April 1981) is a Pakistani politician who had been a member of the National Assembly of Pakistan, from June 2013 to May 2018.

Early life
He was born on 3 April 1981.

Political career

Khan was elected to the National Assembly of Pakistan as an independent candidate from Constituency NA-23 (Kohistan) in 2013 Pakistani general election. He received 17498 votes and defeated a candidate of Jamiat Ulema-e Islam (F).

He later joined Pakistan Muslim League (N). During his tenure as Member of the National Assembly, he served as the Federal Parliamentary Secretary for Textile Industry. In October 2017, he was made Federal Parliamentary Secretary for Statistics.

References

Living people
Pakistan Muslim League (N) politicians
Pashtun people
People from Kohistan District
Pakistani MNAs 2013–2018
1981 births